Generalovsky is a rural locality (a khutor) and the administrative center of Generalovskoye Rural Settlement, Kotelnikovsky District, Volgograd Oblast, Russia. The population was 1,055 as of 2010. There are 23 streets.

Geography 
Generalovsky is located on the south bank of the Tsimlyansk Reservoir, 45 km north of Kotelnikovo (the district's administrative centre) by road. Novoaksaysky is the nearest rural locality.

References 

Rural localities in Kotelnikovsky District